Ufimsky (masculine), Ufimskaya (feminine), or Ufimskoye (neuter) may refer to:
Ufimsky District, a district of the Republic of Bashkortostan, Russia
Ufimsky (rural locality) (Ufimskaya, Ufimskoye), name of several rural localities in Russia